Suja Juice is an organic, non-GMO, cold-pressed juice company based in San Diego, California. Suja produces cold-pressed juices, waters and drinking vinegars. It is the largest independent producer of cold-pressed juice sold in the United States.

History
Suja was founded by four San Diegans from different walks of life. Annie Lawless stated in a 2012 interview that Suja means "long, beautiful life" in "".

Since launch, Suja expanded nationally by partnering with small batch food networks like Farm2Me and GoodEggs.

In August 2015, The Coca-Cola Company took a 30% minority stake in the company for approximately $90 million, and signed a deal for Suja Juice products to be sold via Coca-Cola's distribution network and produced at Coca-Cola's bottling facilities, without changing the products' recipes.

Products
All Suja Juice products are made from organic, non-GMO fruits and vegetables, and are vegan, kosher, gluten-free, dairy-free and soy-free. They use BPA-free, PETE plastic bottles for packaging and source locally to reduce their carbon footprint.

References

Drink companies based in California
Juice
Manufacturing companies based in San Diego
Companies based in San Diego County, California
Food and drink companies based in California
Food and drink companies established in 2012
Manufacturing companies established in 2012
Companies established in 2012
2012 establishments in California
Juice brands